Dulal Dutta (c. 1925 – 17 August 2010; Kolkata) was a film editor in the Bengali film industry located in Kolkata (previously Calcutta), West Bengal, India. He is especially remembered for his association with the acclaimed film director Satyajit Ray, whose films were all edited by Datta.

Filmography
 Debatra (1955)
 Pather Panchali (1955)
 Aparajito (1956)
 Asha (1956)
 Andhare Alo (1957)
 Parash Pathar (1958)
 Jalsaghar (1958)
 Apur Sansar (1959)
 Devi (1960)
 Teen Kanya (1961)
 Rabindranath Tagore (1961)
 Kanchenjungha (1962)
 Abhijan (1962)
 Mahanagar (1963)
 Charulata (1964)
 Mahapurush (1965)
 Kapurush (1965)
 Nayak (1966)
 Chiriyakhana (1967)
 Balika Badhu (1967)
 Goopy Gyne Bagha Byne (1968)
 Charan Kavi Mukundadas (1968)
 Aranyer Din Ratri (1970)
 Sikkim (1971)
 Seemabaddha (1971)
 The Inner Eye (1972)
 Pratidwandi (1972)
 Ashani Sanket (1973)
 Sonar Kella (1974)
 Jana Aranya (1976)
 Shatranj Ke Khilari (1977)
 Heerak Rajar Deshe (1980)
 Sadgati (1981) (TV) 
 Pikoo (1981) (TV)
 Phatik Chand (1983)
 Ghare Baire (1984)
 Ganashatru (1989)
 Shakha Proshakha (1990)
 Goopy Bagha Phire Elo (1991)
 Agantuk (1991)
 Uttoran (1994)
 Target (1995)

Sound Department
 Chiriyakhana (1967) (sound editor)
 Balika Badhu (1967) (English title: The Young Wife) (sound editor)

Notes

References

External links
 
Regular cast and crew of Satyajit Ray films

1920s births
2010 deaths
Film directors from Kolkata
Bengali film editors
20th-century Indian film directors
Film editors from West Bengal